Lohmen is a municipality in the Sächsische Schweiz-Osterzgebirge district, in Saxony, Germany.

History 
Lohmen was first officially recognized as a village in 1292. The village name comes from the Slovak term lom or "fissure". There were quarries in the area as early as 1200, and were the first and biggest in the region. Lohmen and the kingdom Wehlen-Lohmen belonged to the House of Schönburg until it was traded for other property to Maurice, Elector of Saxony in 1543. In the 19th century it became part of the city of Pirna.

Public services 
Volunteer Fire Department Lohmen
Lohmen Elementary School
Kindergarten and daycare services

Nearby attractions 
Bastei
Lohmen Castle

References